The Graceville Correctional Facility  is a private state prison for men located in Graceville, Jackson County, Florida, which has been operated since 2007 by CCA, GEO, and MTC under contract with the Florida Department of Corrections.  

This facility was opened in 2007 and has a maximum capacity of 1884 prisoners housed at various security levels.

References

Prisons in Florida
Buildings and structures in Jackson County, Florida
GEO Group
2007 establishments in Florida